Radionomy was an online platform that provided tools for operating online radio stations. It was part of Radionomy Group, a company which later acquired the online streaming platform SHOUTcast from Nullsoft, and eventually consolidated Radionomy into its SHOUTcast service.

Concept

The name of Radionomy is a contraction of two words: radio + autonomy. Radionomy allows users to create their own online radio or listen to online radio, all created and programmed by users. Through a platform called RMO, they can choose music, chronic and radio jingles or they wish to broadcast their radio. They can add their own audio content including own musical pieces, jingles. Moreover, it is possible to make live broadcasts.

Radionomy acquires copyright license for its music content through SABAM. It generates revenue to pay royalties and other operating costs by broadcasting up to four minutes per hour of advertising.

History

Radionomy was founded in September 2007 by four Belgian entrepreneurs: Alexandre Saboundjian Gilles Bindels, Cedric van Kan and Yves Baudechon.

2008
17 January  Radionomy held a press conference at the Eiffel Tower in Paris, and announced the public launch of the planned business April 17, 2008.
Late February  the alpha version of the Radio Manager is broadcast from a community of beta testers selected based on their radio project. This is the beginning of the beta test.
17 April  the Radionomy site opens to the Belgian and French public, allowing visitors to listen to Internet radio stations created on the platform.
17 June  Radionomy has released its beta.

2010
Unknown  after several beta waves, live function is incorporated into all web radios, whatever the creation date and the number of radio listeners.

2011
February 15  opening of the feature "Play the radio" allowing all producers radios can have a website pre-designed.
March  the launch of the advertising Adionomy that allows advertisers to broadcast their advertising on the web radios targeting listeners.
30 May  Radionomy invests in Hotmixradio.

2012
June 28  Radionomy announces the signing of an agreement with the US digital advertising platform Targetspot.
August 29  Adionomy board was launched, new governance in the world of digital radio in France.
5 September  Radionomy announces the opening of its US headquarters in San Francisco.
18 September  Radionomy launched G2, the new version of the platform. This includes updates to the site radionomy.com, and the release of the Radio Manager Online online platform which replaced the older Radio Manager desktop application. Facebook, iPhone, and iPad applications were also released.
late October  Alexander Saboundjian, CEO of Radionomy, became manager of Hotmixradio, instead of its founder Olivier Riou.

2013
18 September  Radionomy won the award "International Excellence in Online Audio" awarded at the RAIN Summit in Orlando, Florida.
December 16  Radionomy acquired U.S.-based advertising Targetspot.

2014

17 January  Radionomy formalizes the acquisition of Winamp and SHOUTcast from AOL. However, TechCrunch has reported that the sale of Winamp and Shoutcast is worth between $5 and $10 million, with AOL taking a 12% stake (a financial, not strategic, investment) in Radionomy in the process.

2015
On 17 December 2015, Vivendi acquired a 64.4% majority stake in Radionomy. Its shareholders including its employees and U.S.-based investment company Union Square Ventures, retained its stake in the company.

2016
26 February  In a lawsuit filed at a California federal court, a group of Sony brands – including Arista Records, LaFace Records and Sony Music Entertainment – accused Radionomy of copyright infringement. The case was settled out of court shortly thereafter.

2017
 AudioValley acquired a majority stake in Radionomy.
"In August 2017, AudioValley acquired the 64.4% stake held by Vivendi in Radionomy Group BV. AudioValley now owns 98.53% of the company's capital."

2020
 On 1 January, Radionomy shut down its streaming service and migrated towards the Shoutcast platform. This move was part of the group's wish to offer all digital radio producers new professional-quality tools to better meet their needs.

2022 

 5 July  AudioValley renames itself to Targetspot, with its focus shifting to its digital audio monetisation business.
 22 November - Azerion Group N.V. acquires Radionomy Group B.V. and all of its subsidiaries (Targetspot and Shoutcast).

List of properties owned by Radionomy
In addition to its own online radio aggregation service, Radionomy owns audio and radio-related digital properties:
Hotmixradio
SHOUTcast
Targetspot
Winamp

References

External links

 
Belgian companies established in 2008
Internet radio